Romantic comedy is a genre that blends romance and comedy.

Romantic Comedy may also refer to:
 Romantic Comedy (play), a 1979 play written by Bernard Slade 
 Romantic Comedy (1983 film), a 1983 film adapted from the play and starring Dudley Moore and Mary Steenburgen
 Romantic Comedy (2010 film), a 2010 Turkish film, also known as Romantik Komedi
 Romantic Comedy (2019 film), a 2019 documentary about romantic comedies